No Promises...No Debts is an album by Dutch hard rock band Golden Earring, released in 1979. In the U.S. the album was released with a different cover photo showing the group standing around.

Track listing
All songs written by Gerritsen, Hay, Kooymans, and Zuiderwijk.

Side one
"Heart Beat" - 3:00
"Need Her" - 3:07
"Sellin' Out" - 3:46
"Snot Love in Spain" - 3:50
"Save Your Skin" - 6:42

Side two
"D Light" - 3:34
"Tiger Bay" - 3:12
"Weekend Love" - 4:14
"Don't Close the Door" - 3:29
"Don't Stop the Show" - 2:41
"By Routes" - 2:53

Personnel
George Kooymans - guitar, vocals
Rinus Gerritsen - bass guitar, keyboards
Barry Hay - flute, vocals, guitar
Cesar Zuiderwijk - drums
Additional personnel 
John Legrand - harmonica

Production
Producer: George Kooymans
Engineer: John Kriek
Mixing: George Kooymans, John Kriek, Arnold Muhren
Horn arrangements: Jan Rietman
Cover design: Jeep Bunt

Charts

References

Golden Earring albums
1979 albums
Polydor Records albums